Below is a list of members of the European Parliament serving in the seventh term (2009–2014). It is sorted by an English perception of surname treating all variations of de/di/do, van/von, Ó, and so forth as part of the collation key, even if this is not the normal practice in a member's own country.

During the 2009–2014 term, there were 736 members of parliament divided among the 27 member states, which increased to 754 per 1 December 2011 following the Treaty of Lisbon. Upon Croatia's accession in 2013, its 12 new seats added up to a total of 766 members of parliament.

List of members

Austria 

Austria elected 17 MEPs, which increased to 19 from 1 December 2011.

On the Austrian People's Party list: (European People's Party Group)
Othmar Karas
Elisabeth Köstinger
Hella Ranner (Replaced by Heinz K. Becker in 2011)
Paul Rübig
Richard Seeber
Ernst Strasser (Replaced by Hubert Pirker in 2011)
On the Social Democratic Party of Austria list: (Progressive Alliance of Socialists and Democrats)
Karin Kadenbach
Jörg Leichtfried
Evelyn Regner
Hannes Swoboda
Josef Weidenholzer (from 1 December 2011)

On the Martin list: (no group)
Martin Ehrenhauser
Hans-Peter Martin
Angelika Werthmann
On the Freedom Party of Austria list: (no group)
Andreas Mölzer
Franz Obermayr
On the Greens – The Green Alternative list: (The Greens–European Free Alliance)
Eva Lichtenberger
Ulrike Lunacek
On the Alliance for the Future of Austria list:
 Ewald Stadler (from 1 December 2011)

Belgium 

Belgium elected 22 MEPs.

Dutch-speaking electoral college:

On the Christen-Democratisch en Vlaams list: (EPP Group)
Ivo Belet
Jean-Luc Dehaene
Marianne Thyssen
On the Flemish Liberals and Democrats list: (ALDE)
Annemie Neyts-Uyttebroeck
Dirk Sterckx (replaced by Philippe De Backer)
Guy Verhofstadt
On the VB list: (no group)
Filip Dewinter (replaced by Philip Claeys)
Frank Vanhecke
On the Socialistische Partij Anders list: (PASD)
Saïd El Khadraoui
Kathleen Van Brempt
On the Nieuw-Vlaamse Alliantie list: (Greens-EFA)
Bart De Wever (replaced by Frieda Brepoels, replaced by Mark Demesmaeker)
On the Groen! Party list: (Greens-EFA)
Bart Staes
On the Lijst Dedecker list: (European Conservatives and Reformists)
Derk Jan Eppink

French-speaking electoral college:

On the Socialist Party list: (PASD)
Frédéric Daerden
Véronique De Keyser
Jean-Claude Marcourt (replaced by Marc Tarabella in 2009)
On the Mouvement Réformateur list: (ALDE)
Louis Michel
Frédérique Ries
On the Ecolo list: (Greens-EFA)
Isabelle Durant
Philippe Lamberts
On the Centre démocrate humaniste list: (EPP Group)
Anne Delvaux
German-speaking electoral college:

On the Christian Social Party list: (EPP Group)
Mathieu Grosch

Bulgaria 

Bulgaria elected 17 MEPs, which increased to 18 from 1 December 2011.

On the Citizens for European Development of Bulgaria list: (EPP Group)
Iliana Ivanova
Rumiana Jeleva (Replaced by Andrey Kovatchev) 
Maria Nedeltcheva
Emil Stoyanov (Replaced by Monika Panayotova in 2012)
Vladimir Urutchev
On the Bulgarian Socialist Party list: (PASD)
Ivaylo Kalfin
Evgeni Kirilov
Kristian Vigenin
Iliana Yotova
On the Movement for Rights and Freedoms list: (ALDE)
Metin Kazak
Filiz Husmenova
Vladko Panayotov

On the Attack list: (no group)
Slavcho Binev
Dimitar Stoyanov
On the National Movement for Stability and Progress list: (ALDE)
Meglena Kuneva (Replaced by Stanimir Ilchev)
Antonia Parvanova
On the Union of Democratic Forces list: (EPP Group)
Nadezhda Mihaylova
On the Democrats for a Strong Bulgaria list: (EPP Group)
Svetoslav Malinov (from 1 December 2011)

Croatia (2013) 

Croatia elected 12 MEPs upon its accession in 2013.

On the Croatian Democratic Union and allies (HSP AS–BUZ) list: (EPP)
Zdravka Bušić
Ivana Maletić
Andrej Plenković
Davor Ivo Stier
Dubravka Šuica
Ruža Tomašić

On the Social Democratic Party of Croatia and allies (HNS–HSU) list: (S&D)
Marino Baldini
Biljana Borzan
Sandra Petrović Jakovina
Tonino Picula
Oleg Valjalo
On the Croatian Labourists – Labour Party list: (S&D)
Nikola Vuljanić

Cyprus 

Cyprus elected 6 MEPs.

On the Democratic Rally list: (EPP Group)
Ioannis Kasoulidis
Eleni Theocharous
On the Progressive Party of Working People list: (EUL/NGL)
Takis Hadjigeorgiou
Kyriacos Triantaphyllides

On the Democratic Party list: (PASD)
Antigoni Papadopoulou
On the Movement for Social Democracy list: (PASD)
Kyriakos Mavronikolas (replaced by Sophocles Sophocleous)

Czech Republic 

The Czech Republic elected 22 MEPs.

On the Civic Democratic Party list: (ECR)
Milan Cabrnoch
Andrea Češková
Hynek Fajmon
Edvard Kožušník
Miroslav Ouzký
Ivo Strejček
Evžen Tošenovský
Oldřich Vlasák
Jan Zahradil
On the Czech Social Democratic Party list: (PASD)
Zuzana Brzobohatá
Robert Dušek
Richard Falbr
Jiří Havel replaced by Vojtěch Mynář
Pavel Poc
Libor Rouček
Olga Sehnalová

On the Communist Party of Bohemia and Moravia list: (EUL/NGL)
Jaromír Kohlíček
Jiří Maštálka
Miloslav Ransdorf
Vladimír Remek
On the Christian and Democratic Union – Czechoslovak People's Party list: (EPP Group)
Jan Březina
Zuzana Roithová

Denmark 

Denmark elected 13 MEPs.

On the Social Democrats list: (PASD)
Ole Christensen
Dan Jørgensen
Christel Schaldemose
Britta Thomsen
On the Venstre list: (ALDE)
Anne E Jensen
Morten Løkkegaard
Jens Rohde

On the Socialist People's Party list: (Greens-EFA)
Margrete Auken
Emilie Turunen
On the Danish People's Party list: (EFD)
Morten Messerschmidt
Anna Rosbach Andersen
On the Conservative People's Party list: (EPP Group)
Bendt Bendtsen
On the People's Movement against the EU list: (EUL/NGL)
Søren Søndergaard (Replaced by Rina Ronja Kari in 2014)

Estonia 

Estonia elected 6 MEPs.

On the Estonian Centre Party list: (ALDE)
Siiri Oviir
Edgar Savisaar (Replaced by Vilja Savisaar)
On the Indrek Tarand list: (Greens-EFA)
Indrek Tarand
On the Estonian Reform Party list: (ALDE)
Kristiina Ojuland

On the Union of Pro Patria and Res Publica list: (EPP Group)
Tunne Kelam
On the Social Democratic Party list: (PASD)
Ivari Padar

Finland 

Finland elected 13 MEPs.

On the National Coalition Party list: (EPP Group)
Ville Itälä (replaced by Petri Sarvamaa)
Eija-Riitta Korhola
Sirpa Pietikäinen
On the Centre Party list: (ALDE)
Anneli Jäätteenmäki
Riikka Manner
Hannu Takkula
On the Social Democratic Party list: (PASD)
Liisa Jaakonsaari
Mitro Repo

On the Green League list: (Greens-EFA)
Satu Hassi
Heidi Hautala (replaced by Tarja Cronberg in 2011)
On the True Finns/Christian Democrats  list: (EFD and EPP Group)
Sari Essayah (Christian Democrats is in EPP Group)
Timo Soini  (True Finns is in EFD) (replaced by Sampo Terho in 2011)
On the Swedish People's Party list: (ALDE)
Carl Haglund (replaced by Nils Torvalds)

France 

France elected 72 MEPs, which increased to 74 from 1 December 2011.

On the Union for a Popular Movement/New Centre list: (EPP Group)
Damien Abad
Jean-Pierre Audy
Michel Barnier (replaced by Constance Le Grip)
Dominique Baudis (replaced by Franck Proust)
Christophe Béchu (replaced by Agnès Le Brun)
Sophie Briard-Auconie
Alain Cadec
Jean-Marie Cavada
Arnaud Danjean
Michel Dantin
Rachida Dati
Joseph Daul
Christine de Veyrac
Gaston Franco
Marielle Gallo
Jean-Paul Gauzès
Françoise Grossetête
Pascale Gruny (replaced by Philippe Boulland)
Philippe Juvin
Alain Lamassoure
Véronique Mathieu
Élisabeth Morin
Maurice Ponga
Jean Roatta (from 1 December 2011)
Dominique Riquet
Tokia Saïfi
Marie-Thérèse Sanchez-Schmidt
Catherine Soullie (replaced by Brice Hortefeux)
Michèle Striffler
Dominique Vlasto
On the Socialist Party list: (PASD)
Kader Arif
Pervenche Berès
Françoise Castex
Harlem Désir
Estelle Grelier
Sylvie Guillaume
Liêm Hoang Ngoc
Stéphane Le Foll
Gilles Pargneaux
Vincent Peillon
Patrice Tirolien
Catherine Trautmann
Bernadette Vergnaud
Henri Weber

On the Europe Écologie list: (Greens-EFA)
François Alfonsi
Sandrine Bélier
Malika Benarab-Attou
Jean-Paul Besset
José Bové
Pascal Canfin
Yves Cochet (from 1 December 2011)
Daniel Cohn-Bendit
Karima Delli
Hélène Flautre
Catherine Grèze
Yannick Jadot
Eva Joly
Nicole Kiil-Nielsen
Michèle Rivasi
On the Democratic Movement  list: (ALDE)
Jean-Luc Bennahmias
Marielle de Sarnez
Sylvie Goulard
Nathalie Griesbeck
Corinne Lepage
Robert Rochefort
On the Left Front list: (EUL/NGL)
Jacky Hénin
Élie Hoarau (replaced by Younous Omarjee)
Patrick Le Hyaric
Jean-Luc Mélenchon
Marie-Christine Vergiat
On the National Front list: (no group)
Bruno Gollnisch
Jean-Marie Le Pen
Marine Le Pen
On the Libertas list: (EFD)
Philippe de Villiers

Germany 

Germany elected 99 MEPs.

On the Christian Democratic Union list: (EPP Group)
Burkhard Balz
Reimer Böge
Elmar Brok
Daniel Caspary
Christian Ehler
Karl-Heinz Florenz
Michael Gahler
Ingeborg Grässle
Christa Klaß
Peter Jahr
Elisabeth Jeggle
Dieter-Lebrecht Koch
Werner Kuhn
Werner Langen
Kurt Lechner (replaced by Birgit Collin-Langen)
Klaus-Heiner Lehne
Hans-Peter Liese
Thomas Mann
Hans-Peter Mayer
Doris Pack
Markus Pieper
Hans-Gert Pöttering
Godelieve Quisthoudt-Rowohl
Herbert Reul
Horst Schnellhardt
Birgit Schnieber-Jastram
Andreas Schwab
Renate Sommer
Thomas Ulmer
Sabine Verheyen
Axel Voss
Rainer Wieland
Hermann Winkler
Joachim Zeller
On the Social Democratic Party list: (PASD)
Udo Bullmann
Ismail Ertug
Knut Fleckenstein
Evelyne Gebhardt
Jens Geier
Norbert Glante
Matthias Groote
Jutta Haug
Petra Kammerevert
Constanze Krehl
Wolfgang Kreissl-Dörfler
Bernd Lange
Jo Leinen
Norbert Neuser
Bernhard Rapkay
Dagmar Roth-Behrendt
Ulrike Rodust
Martin Schulz
Peter Simon
Birgit Sippel
Jutta Steinruck
Barbara Weiler
Kerstin Westphal

On the Alliance '90/The Greens list: (Greens-EFA)
Jan Philipp Albrecht
Franziska Brantner
Reinhard Bütikofer
Michael Cramer
Sven Giegold
Gerald Häfner
Rebecca Harms
Martin Häusling
Ska Keller
Barbara Lochbihler
Heide Rühle
Elisabeth Schroedter
Werner Schulz
Helga Trüpel
On the Free Democratic Party list: (ALDE)
Alexander Alvaro
Jorgo Chatzimarkakis
Jürgen Creutzmann
Alexander Graf Lambsdorff
Nadja Hirsch
Wolf Klinz
Silvana Koch-Mehrin
Holger Krahmer
Gesine Meißner
Britta Reimers
Alexandra Thein
Michael Theurer
On Left list: (EUL/NGL)
Lothar Bisky
Cornelia Ernst
Thomas Händel
Jürgen Klute
Sabine Lösing
Helmut Scholz
Sabine Wils
Gabi Zimmer
On the Christian Social Union list: (EPP Group)
Albert Deß
Markus Ferber
Monika Hohlmeier
Martin Kastler
Angelika Niebler
Bernd Posselt
Manfred Weber
Anja Weisgerber

Greece 

Greece elected 22 MEPs.

On the Panhellenic Socialist Movement list: (PASD)
Kriton Arsenis
Marilena Koppa
Stavros Lambrinidis (Replaced by Dimitrios Droutsas in 2011)
Giorgos Papakonstantinou (Replaced by Spyros Danellis in 2009)
Anni Podimata
Sylvana Rapti
Chrysoula Paliadeli
Giorgos Stavrakakis
On the New Democracy list: (EPP Group)
Giorgos Koumoutsakos
Rodi Kratsa-Tsagaropoulou
Giorgos Papanikolaou
Georgios Papastamkos
Kostas Poupakis
Theodoros Skylakakis
Giannis Tsoukalas
Marietta Giannakou

On the Communist Party of Greece list: (EUL/NGL)
Athanasios Pafilis (Replaced by Charalampos Angourakis in 2009)
Giorgos Toussas
On the Popular Orthodox Rally list: (EFD)
Niki Tzavela
Athanasios Plevris (Replaced by Nikolaos Salavrakos in 2009)
On the Coalition of the Radical Left list: (EUL/NGL)
Nikos Chountis
On the Ecologist Greens list: (Greens-EFA)
Michalis Tremopoulos (replaced by Nikos Chrysogelos)

Hungary 

Hungary elected 22 MEPs.

On the Fidesz list: (EPP Group)
János Áder
Tamás Deutsch
Kinga Gál
Béla Glattfelder
Enikő Győri (Replaced by Zoltán Bagó in 2010)
András Gyürk
Ágnes Hankiss
Lívia Járóka
Ádám Kósa
Csaba Őry
Pál Schmitt (Replaced by Ildikó Pelczné Gáll in 2010)
György Schöpflin
László Surján
József Szájer

On the Hungarian Socialist Party list: (PASD)
Kinga Göncz
Zita Gurmai
Edit Herczog
Csaba Tabajdi
On the Jobbik list: (no group)
Zoltán Balczó (Replaced by Béla Kovács in 2010)
Krisztina Morvai
Csanád Szegedi
On the Hungarian Democratic Forum list: (ECR)
Lajos Bokros

Ireland 

Ireland elected 12 MEPs.

On the Fine Gael list: (EPP Group)
Jim Higgins
Seán Kelly
Mairead McGuinness
Gay Mitchell
On the Fianna Fáil list: (ALDE)
Liam Aylward
Brian Crowley
Pat "the Cope" Gallagher

On the Labour Party list: (PASD)
Nessa Childers
Proinsias De Rossa (Replaced by Emer Costello in 2012)
Alan Kelly (Replaced by Phil Prendergast in 2011)
On the Socialist Party list: (EUL/NGL)
Joe Higgins (Replaced by Paul Murphy in 2011)
On the Independent list: (ALDE)
Marian Harkin

Italy 

Italy elected 72 MEPs, which increased to 73 from 1 December 2011.

On the People of Freedom list: (EPP Group)
Gabriele Albertini
Roberta Angelilli
Alfredo Antoniozzi
Raffaele Baldassarre
Paolo Bartolozzi
Sergio Berlato
Vito Bonsignore
Antonio Cancian
Giovanni Collino (replaced by Giuseppe Gargani)
Lara Comi
Carlo Fidanza
Elisabetta Gardini
Salvatore Iacolino
Giovanni La Via
Clemente Mastella
Barbara Matera
Mario Mauro (replaced by Susy De Martini)
Erminia Mazzoni
Cristiana Muscardini
Alfredo Pallone
Aldo Patriciello
Crescenzio Rivellini
Licia Ronzulli
Potito Salatto
Amalia Sartori
Marco Scurria
Sergio Silvestris
Salvatore Tatarella
Iva Zanicchi

On the Democratic Party list: (PASD)
Francesca Balzani
Luigi Berlinguer
Rita Borsellino
Salvatore Caronna
Sergio Cofferati
Silvia Costa
Andrea Cozzolino
Rosario Crocetta
Francesco De Angelis
Paolo De Castro
Leonardo Domenici
Roberto Gualtieri
Guido Milana
Pier Antonio Panzeri
Mario Pirillo
Gianni Pittella
Vittorio Prodi
David Sassoli
Debora Serracchiani
Gianluca Susta
Patrizia Toia

On the Lega Nord list: (EFD)
Mara Bizzotto
Mario Borghezio
Lorenzo Fontana
Claudio Morganti
Fiorello Provera
Oreste Rossi
Matteo Salvini
Giancarlo Scottà
Francesco Speroni

On the Italy of Values list: (ALDE)
Sonia Alfano
Pino Arlacchi
Vincenzo Iovine
Niccolò Rinaldi
Giommaria Uggias
Gianni Vattimo
Luigi de Magistris (replaced by Andrea Zanoni)

On the Union of the Centre list: (EPP Group)
Magdi Allam
Antonello Antinoro
Carlo Casini
Ciriaco De Mita
Tiziano Motti

On the South Tyrolean People's Party list: (EPP Group)
Herbert Dorfmann

Latvia 

Latvia elected 8 MEPs, which increased to 9 from 1 December 2011.

On the Civic Union list: (EPP Group)
Sandra Kalniete
Inese Vaidere
Kārlis Šadurskis (from 1 December 2011)
On the Harmony Centre list: (EUL/NGL and PASD)
Alexander Mirsky (National Harmony Party is in PASD)
Alfreds Rubiks (Socialist Party of Latvia is in EUL/NGL)
On the For Human Rights in United Latvia list: (Greens-EFA)
Tatjana Ždanoka

On the LPP/LC list: (ALDE)
Ivars Godmanis
On the For Fatherland and Freedom/LNNK list: (ECR)
Roberts Zīle
On the New Era Party list: (EPP Group)
Artūrs Krišjānis Kariņš

Lithuania 

Lithuania elected 12 MEPs.

On the Homeland Union – Lithuanian Christian Democrats list: (EPP Group)
Laima Andrikienė
Vytautas Landsbergis
Radvilė Morkūnaitė
Algirdas Saudargas
On the Social Democratic Party list: (PASD)
Zigmantas Balčytis
Vilija Blinkevičiūtė
Justas Vincas Paleckis
On the Order and Justice list: (EFD)
Juozas Imbrasas
Rolandas Paksas

On the Labour Party list: (ALDE)
Viktor Uspaskich (Replaced by Justina Vitkauskaitė in 2012)
On the Electoral Action of Poles in Lithuania list: (ECR)
Valdemar Tomaševski
On the Liberal Movement list: (ALDE)
Leonidas Donskis

Luxembourg 

Luxembourg elected 6 MEPs.

On the Christian Social People's Party list: (EPP Group)
Frank Engel
Astrid Lulling
Georges Bach
On the Luxembourg Socialist Workers' Party list: (PES)
Robert Goebbels

On the Democratic Party list: (ALDE)
Charles Goerens
On Déi Gréng list: (Greens-EFA)
Claude Turmes

Malta 

Malta elected 5 MEPs, which increased to 6 from 1 December 2011.

On the Labour Party list: (PASD)
John Attard Montalto
Louis Grech (Replaced by Claudette Abela Baldachino in 2013)
Edward Scicluna (Replaced by Marlene Mizzi in 2013)
Joseph Cuschieri (from 1 December 2011)

On the Nationalist Party list: (EPP Group)
Simon Busuttil (Replaced by Roberta Metsola Tedesco Triccas in 2013)
David Casa

Netherlands 

The Netherlands elected 25 MEPs, which increased to 26 from 1 December 2011.

On the Christian Democratic Appeal list: (EPP Group)
 Esther de Lange
 Ria Oomen-Ruijten
 Wim van de Camp
 Lambert van Nistelrooij
 Corien Wortmann-Kool
On the Party for Freedom list: (no group)
 Louis Bontes (replaced by Lucas Hartong)
 Barry Madlener (replaced by Patricia van der Kammen)
 Daniël van der Stoep (replaced by Auke Zijlstra)
 Laurence Stassen
On the Dutch Labour Party list: (PASD)
 Thijs Berman
 Emine Bozkurt
 Judith Merkies
On the People's Party for Freedom and Democracy list: (ALDE)
 Jeanine Hennis-Plasschaert (replaced by Jan Mulder)
 Toine Manders
 Hans van Baalen

On the Democrats 66 list: (ALDE)
 Gerben-Jan Gerbrandy
 Sophie in 't Veld
 Marietje Schaake
On the GreenLeft list: (Greens-EFA)
 Marije Cornelissen
 Bas Eickhout
 Judith Sargentini
On the Socialist Party list: (EUL/NGL)
 Dennis de Jong
 Kartika Liotard
On the ChristianUnion – Reformed Political Party list: (ECR and EFD)
 Bastiaan Belder (Reformed Political Party is in EFD)
 Peter van Dalen (ChristianUnion is in ECR)
Independent (no group)
 Daniël van der Stoep (resigned in September 2011 while on the Party for Freedom list, was replaced there by Auke Zijlstra. However, due to the Netherlands gaining an extra seat in December 2011 he was allowed to return to the European Parliament. The Party for Freedom did not allow him to return, so he sits as an independent.)

Poland 

Poland elected 50 MEPs, which increased to 51 from 1 December 2011.

On the Civic Platform list: (EPP Group)
Piotr Borys
Jerzy Buzek
Róża Gräfin Von Thun Und Hohenstein
Małgorzata Handzlik
Jolanta Hibner
Danuta Hübner
Danuta Jazłowiecka
Sidonia Jędrzejewska
Filip Kaczmarek
Lena Kolarska-Bobińska
Janusz Lewandowski (replaced by Jan Kozłowski)
Krzysztof Lisek
Elżbieta Łukacijewska
Bogdan Marcinkiewicz
Sławomir Nitras
Jan Olbrycht
Jacek Protasiewicz
Jacek Saryusz-Wolski
Joanna Skrzydlewska
Bogusław Sonik
Rafał Trzaskowski
Jarosław Wałęsa
Paweł Zalewski
Artur Zasada
Tadeusz Zwiefka

On the Law and Justice list: (ECR)
Adam Bielan
Tadeusz Cymański
Ryszard Czarnecki
Marek Gróbarczyk
Michał Kamiński
Paweł Kowal
Jacek Kurski
Ryszard Legutko
Marek Migalski
Mirosław Piotrowski
Tomasz Poręba
Konrad Szymański
Jacek Włosowicz
Janusz Wojciechowski
Zbigniew Ziobro

On the Democratic Left Alliance-Labor Union list: (PASD)
Lidia Geringer de Oedenberg
Adam Gierek
Bogusław Liberadzki
Wojciech Olejniczak
Joanna Senyszyn
Marek Siwiec
Janusz Zemke
On the Polish People's Party list: (EPP Group)
Arkadiusz Bratkowski (from 1 December 2011)
Andrzej Grzyb
Jarosław Kalinowski
Czesław Siekierski

Portugal 

Portugal elected 22 MEPs.

On the Social Democratic Party list: (EPP Group)
Maria da Graça Martins da Silva Carvalho
Carlos Miguel Maximiano de Almeida Coelho
Mário Henrique de Almeida Santos David
José Manuel Ferreira Fernandes
Maria do Céu Patrão Neves de Frias Martins
Regina Maria Pinto da Fonseca Ramos Bastos
Paulo Artur dos Santos Castro de Campos Rangel
Nuno Alexandre Pisco Pola Teixeira de Jesus
On the Socialist Party list: (PASD)
António Fernando Correia de Campos
Edite de Fátima Santos Marreiros Estrela
Elisa Maria da Costa Guimarães Ferreira
Ana Maria Rosa Martins Gomes
Luis Manuel Capoulas Santos
Vital Martins Moreira
Luís Paulo de Serpa Alves

On the Left Bloc list: (EUL/NGL)
Maria Isabel dos Santos Matias
Rui Miguel Marcelino Tavares Pereira
Miguel Sacadura Cabral Portas (replaced by Alda Sousa)
On the Democratic Unity Coalition list: (EUL/NGL)
Maria Ilda da Costa Figueiredo (replaced by Inês Zuber)
João Manuel Peixoto Ferreira
On the Democratic and Social Centre - People´s Party list: (EPP Group)
Diogo Nuno de Gouveia Torres Feio
João Nuno Lacerda Teixeira de Melo

Romania 

Romania elected 33 MEPs.

On the Social Democratic Party/Conservative Party list: (PASD)
Silvia Adriana Ţicău
Victor Boştinaru
Corina Creţu
Sabin Cutaş
Vasilica Dăncilă
Ioan Enciu
Cătălin Ivan
Ioan Mircea Paşcu
Rovana Plumb (replaced by Minodora Cliveti)
Daciana Sârbu
Adrian Severin
On the Democratic Liberal Party list: (EPP Group)
Elena Oana Antonescu
Petru Luhan
Monica Macovei
Marian-Jean Marinescu
Iosif Matula
Rareş Niculescu
Cristian Preda
Theodor Stolojan 
Traian Ungureanu
Sebastian Valentin Bodu

On the National Liberal Party list: (ALDE)
Cristian Buşoi
Ramona Mănescu
Norica Nicolai
Adina Vălean
Renate Weber
On the Democratic Union of Hungarians in Romania list: (EPP Group)
Csaba Sógor
László Tőkés
Iuliu Winkler
On the Greater Romania Party list: (no group)
Gigi Becali
Claudiu Ciprian Tănăsescu
Corneliu Vadim Tudor
On the Elena Băsescu list: (EPP Group)
Elena Băsescu

Slovakia 

Slovakia elected 13 MEPs.

On the Direction – Social Democracy list: (PASD)
Monika Beňová
Vladimír Maňka
Katarína Neveďalová
Monika Smolková
Boris Zala
On the Slovak Democratic and Christian Union – Democratic Party list: (EPP Group)
Eduard Kukan
Peter Šťastný
On the Party of the Hungarian Coalition list: (EPP Group)
Edit Bauer
Alajos Mészáros

On the Christian Democratic Movement list: (EPP Group)
Miroslav Mikolášik
Anna Záborská
On the People's Party – Movement for a Democratic Slovakia list: (ALDE)
Sergej Kozlík
On the Slovak National Party list: (EFD)
Jaroslav Paška

Slovenia 

Slovenia elected 7 MEPs, which increased to 8 from 1 December 2011.

On the Slovenian Democratic Party list: (EPP Group)
Romana Jordan Cizelj
Milan Zver
Zofija Mazej Kukovič (from 1 December 2011)
On the Social Democrats list: (PASD)
Tanja Fajon
Zoran Thaler (replaced by Mojca Kleva Kekuš)
On the New Slovenia list: (EPP Group)
Lojze Peterle

On the Liberal Democracy list: (ALDE)
Jelko Kacin
On the Zares list: (ALDE)
Ivo Vajgl

Spain 

Spain elected 50 MEPs, which increased to 54 from 1 December 2011.

On the People's Party list: (EPP Group)
Pablo Arias Echeverría
María del Pilar Ayuso González
Luis de Grandes Pascual
Pilar del Castillo Vera
Agustín Díaz de Mera García Consuegra
Rosa Estaràs Ferragut
Carmen Fraga Estévez
José García-Margallo y Marfil (replaced by María Auxiliadora Correa Zamora)
Salvador Garriga Polledo
Cristina Gutiérrez-Cortines Corral
María Esther Herranz García
Santiago Fisas Ayxelá
Carlos José Iturgaiz Angulo
Teresa Jiménez-Becerril
Verónica Lope Fontagne
Antonio López-Istúriz White
Gabriel Mato Adrover
Jaime Mayor Oreja
Francisco José Millán Mon
Íñigo Méndez de Vigo Montojo (replaced by Juan Andrés Naranjo Escobar)
José Salafranca Sánchez-Neira
Alejo Vidal-Quadras Roca
Pablo Zalba Bidegain

On the Spanish Socialist Workers' Party list: (PASD)
Magdalena Álvarez (replaced by Sergio Gutiérrez Prieto)
Josefa Andrés Barea
Inés Ayala
María Badía
Alejandro Cercas
Ricardo Cortés Lastra
Iratxe García
Eider Gardiazabal Rubial
Enrique Guerrero Salom
Ramón Jáuregui Atondo (replaced by María Irigoyen Pérez)
Juan Fernando López Aguilar
Miguel Ángel Martínez Martínez
Antonio Masip Hidalgo
Emilio Menéndez
María Muñiz de Urquiza
Raimon Obiols
Juan Andrés Perelló Rodríguez
Teresa Riera
Carmen Romero López
Antolín Sánchez
Luis Yáñez-Barnuevo
On the Coalition for Europe list: (ALDE)
Izaskun Bilbao Barandica (Basque Nationalist Party)
Ramon Tremosa (Democratic Convergence of Catalonia)
On The Left list: (European United Left–Nordic Green Left and Greens-EFA)
Willy Meyer Pleite (United Left within EUL/NGL)
Raül Romeva (Initiative for Catalonia Greens within Greens-EFA)
On the Union, Progress and Democracy list: (no group)
Francisco Sosa Wagner
On the Europe of the Peoples–Greens list: (Greens-EFA)
Oriol Junqueras (Republican Left of Catalonia) (until 31/12/2011)
Ana Miranda Paz (Galician Nationalist Bloc) (from 01/2012, replaced by Iñaki Irazabalbeitia in 2013)

Sweden 

Sweden elected 18 MEPs, which increased to 20 from 1 December 2011.

On the Social Democrats list: (PASD)
Göran Färm
Anna Hedh
Olle Ludvigsson
Jens Nilsson (from 1 December 2011)
Marita Ulvskog
Åsa Westlund
On the Moderate Party list: (EPP Group)
Anna Maria Corazza Bildt
Christofer Fjellner
Gunnar Hökmark
Anna Ibrisagic
On the Liberal People's Party list: (ALDE)
Marit Paulsen
Olle Schmidt
Cecilia Wikström

On the Green Party list: (Greens-EFA)
Isabella Lövin
Carl Schlyter
On the Pirate Party list: (Greens-EFA)
Amelia Andersdotter (from 1 December 2011)
Christian Engström
On the Left Party list: (EUL/NGL)
Eva-Britt Svensson (replaced by Mikael Gustafsson)
On the Centre Party list: (ALDE)
Lena Ek (replaced by Kent Johansson)
On the Christian Democrats list: (EPP Group)
Alf Svensson

United Kingdom 

The United Kingdom elected 72 MEPs, which increased to 73 from 1 December 2011.

Great Britain 

On the Conservative Party list: (ECR)
Richard Ashworth
Robert Atkins
Philip Bradbourn
Martin Callanan
Giles Chichester
Nirj Deva
James Elles
Vicky Ford
Jacqueline Foster
Ashley Fox
Julie Girling
Daniel Hannan
Malcolm Harbour
Roger Helmer
Syed Kamall
Sajjad Karim
Timothy Kirkhope
Emma McClarkin
Edward McMillan-Scott
Struan Stevenson
Robert Sturdy
Kay Swinburne
Charles Tannock
Geoffrey Van Orden
Marina Yannakoudakis
On the UK Independence Party list: (EFD)
Stuart Agnew
Marta Andreasen
Gerard Batten
Godfrey Bloom
John Bufton
David Campbell Bannerman
Derek Clark
Trevor Colman
William, Earl of Dartmouth
Nigel Farage
Mike Nattrass
Paul Nuttall
Nikki Sinclaire

On the Labour Party list: (PASD)
Michael Cashman
Mary Honeyball
Richard Howitt
Stephen Hughes
David Martin
Linda McAvan
Arlene McCarthy
Claude Moraes
Brian Simpson
Peter Skinner
Catherine Stihler
Derek Vaughan
Glenis Willmott
On the Liberal Democrats list: (ALDE)
Catherine Bearder
Sharon Bowles
Chris Davies
Andrew Duff
Fiona Hall
Sarah Ludford
Liz Lynne (replaced by Phil Bennion)
George Lyon
Bill Newton Dunn
Diana Wallis (replaced by Rebecca Taylor)
Graham Watson
On the Greens (E&W) list: (Greens-EFA)
Jean Lambert
Caroline Lucas (replaced by Keith Taylor)
On the British National Party list: (no group)
Andrew Brons
Nick Griffin
On the Scottish National Party list: (Greens-EFA)
Ian Hudghton
Alyn Smith
On the Plaid Cymru list: (Greens-EFA)
Jillian Evans

Northern Ireland 

On the Sinn Féin list: (EUL/NGL)
Bairbre de Brún (replaced by Martina Anderson)
On the Democratic Unionist Party list: (no group)
Diane Dodds

On the Ulster Conservatives and Unionists – New Force list: (ECR)
Jim Nicholson

See also
 2009 European Parliament election
 Members of the European Parliament 2009–2014

List